Oliver P. Snyder (November 13, 1833 – November 22, 1882) was a U.S. Representative who served from 1871 to 1875 during the Reconstruction of Arkansas.

Born in Missouri, Snyder completed preparatory studies and moved to Arkansas in 1853. He engaged in scientific and literary pursuits and at the same time studied law. He was admitted to the bar and practiced in Pine Bluff in Jefferson County, Arkansas. From 1864 to 1865, he was a member of the Arkansas House of Representatives.
In 1867, he was a delegate to the state constitutional convention. He served in the Arkansas State Senate from 1868 to 1871, in which capacity he was a member of the committee which in 1868 revised and rearranged the statutes of Arkansas.

Snyder was elected as a Republican to the Forty-second and Forty-third Congresses (March 4, 1871 – March 3, 1875). He was an unsuccessful candidate for renomination in 1874. He then resumed his law practice.

He was elected treasurer of Jefferson County in 1882 and served for a few months preceding is death that same year, nine days after his 49th birthday. He is interred at Bellewood Cemetery in Pine Bluff.

References

External links 
 

1833 births
1882 deaths
Republican Party members of the United States House of Representatives from Arkansas
Republican Party Arkansas state senators
Republican Party members of the Arkansas House of Representatives
Arkansas lawyers
Politicians from Pine Bluff, Arkansas
19th-century American politicians
Burials in Arkansas
19th-century American lawyers